Amala may refer to:

People
 Amala Akkineni, South Indian actress
 Amala Chebolu, playback singer in the Telugu film industry, also known as Tollywood
 Amala Paul (born 1991), South Indian actress
 Amala Shankar (1919–2020), Indian dancer
 Amala and Kamala, two girls discovered in 1920 who were allegedly raised by wolves in India
Amala Ratna Zandile Dlamini, known professionally as Doja Cat, American rapper, singer, songwriter, and record producer

Places
 Amala, Iran, a village in Kermanshah Province, Iran
 Amala Nagar, a village in Kerala, India

Other
 Amala (food), a food from Nigeria
 Amala (mythology), a Native American mythological giant
 Amala (TV series), an Indian television series
 Amala Institute of Medical Sciences in Thrissur, India
 Seeds of the Nectandra trees, used in pre-Columbian South American ritual
 Scopula amala, a moth of family Geometridae
 Amala (album), a 2018 album by Doja Cat